After the Thin Man is a 1936 American murder mystery comedy film directed by W. S. Van Dyke and starring William Powell, Myrna Loy and James Stewart. A sequel to the 1934 feature The Thin Man, the film presents Powell and Loy as Dashiell Hammett's characters Nick and Nora Charles. The film also features Elissa Landi, Joseph Calleia, Jessie Ralph, Alan Marshal and Penny Singleton (billed under her maiden name as Dorothy McNulty).

Plot
Nick and Nora Charles return from vacation on New Year's Eve to their home in San Francisco, where Nora's stuffy family expects the couple to join them for a formal dinner. Nick is disliked by Nora's aunt Katherine, the family matriarch, as his immigrant heritage and experience as a "flatfoot" are considered beneath Nora's station. Nora's cousin Selma tells Nora that her husband Robert has been missing for three days. David Graham is Selma's earlier fiancé and an old friend of Nora's family. He offers to pay Robert $25,000 to leave and grant Selma a divorce. Nora successfully badgers Nick into helping to locate Robert.

Robert is at the Lichee Club, a Chinese nightclub, where he has been in an affair with Polly, the club's star performer. Unknown to Robert, Polly and club owner Dancer plan to steal the money that David will pay Robert. Polly's brother Phil Byrnes wants money from her, but Dancer throws him out, just as Nick and Nora arrive looking for Robert.

They tell Robert about David's offer and he agrees to it. After being paid off, Robert goes back into Aunt Katherine's home to retrieve some clothes and say goodbye to Selma, who begs him not to leave. Nick sees Dancer and nightclub co-owner Lum Kee each leave the club separately at the same time. Robert leaves at the stroke of midnight and is shot dead in the foggy street. David finds Selma standing over Robert, a pistol in her hand. Lt. Abrams considers Selma the prime suspect, and her fragile mental state only strengthens his belief. Selma insists that she never fired her gun, but her claim cannot be backed up as David had thrown the gun into San Francisco Bay, thinking she was guilty. Nick begins to investigate to find the actual murderer.

Someone throws a rock with a note tied to it through Nick and Nora's window. The note accuses Polly and Dancer of conspiring to kill Robert while revealing that Phil Byrnes is an ex-con and Polly's husband. Lt. Abrams has found several checks from Robert to Polly, including one for $20,000, but Nick carefully compares them and sees that all but one are forgeries.

Nick and Lt. Abrams find Phil murdered in his hotel room. Nick investigates Polly's apartment and discovers that someone using the name Anderson had bugged it from the apartment above. While in the upper apartment, Nick hears Dancer enter Polly's home. Nick pursues Dancer into the basement, but Dancer fires a round of bullets at Nick and disappears. Nick discovers the body of the building custodian, Pedro. Nora identifies Pedro as the former gardener from her father's estate. She finds a photo in Pedro's room of him with their other servants. Lt. Abrams says someone tried to call Nick from the building just before Pedro was killed.

Nick has Lt. Abrams gather all the suspects in the Anderson apartment. Dancer and Polly confess that they had intended to use a forged check to steal Robert's money but claim that they are innocent of murder. David says that he has not seen Pedro in six years but remembers his long white mustache. But Nick notices that in the picture from six years ago that Nora had found, Pedro had a small, dark mustache, and Nick infers that David saw Pedro recently.

Nick now reconstructs the murder. David is revealed to be Anderson. He hated Robert for taking Selma from him, and also secretly hated Selma for leaving him. He rented the apartment so that he could eavesdrop on Polly and Robert and kill them in the apartment. Instead, he killed Robert on the street and tried to frame Selma for the murder. While spying on Polly, he overheard Phil's real identity and Phil's plan to blackmail David. David murdered Phil and threw the message rock as a diversion.

However, Pedro had recognized David as the mysterious Anderson, so David killed him as well. David brandishes a pistol and threatens to kill Selma and then himself. Lum Kee flings his hat in David's face, allowing Nick and Lt. Abrams to overpower him. This surprises Nora because Nick had Lum Kee's brother sent to prison for bank robbery, but Lum Kee explains: "I no like my brother. I like his girl. I'm your friend. You betcha".

Nick and Nora leave San Francisco by train for the East Coast, accompanied by Selma. Later, alone with Nora, Nick notices that she is knitting a baby's sock and suddenly realizes that she is pregnant. Nora gently chides him, saying, "And you call yourself a detective".

Cast

The cast is listed in order as documented by the American Film Institute:
 William Powell as Nick Charles, called "Nicholas" by Aunt Katherine
 Myrna Loy as Nora Charles
 James Stewart as David Graham
 Elissa Landi as Selma Landis
 Joseph Calleia as "Dancer"
 Jessie Ralph as Aunt Katherine Forrest
 Alan Marshal as Robert Landis
 Teddy Hart as Casper
 Sam Levene as Lieutenant Abrams
 Penny Singleton as Polly Byrnes (credited as Dorothy McNulty)
 William Law as Lum Kee
 George Zucco as Dr. Kammer
 Paul Fix as Phil Byrnes
 Skippy as Asta
 Harlan Briggs as Burton Forrest (uncredited) Harlan Briggs: Burton Forrest
 Maude Turner Gordon as Helen (uncredited)
 Tom Ricketts as Henry, the butler (uncredited)
 Zeffie Tilbury as Aunt Lucy (uncredited)
 Esther Howard as the woman at Lichee Club who says "Hello, handsome" to Nick (uncredited)

Production
The film's storyline was written by Dashiell Hammett based on his characters Nick and Nora, but not on a particular novel or short story. Albert Hackett and Frances Goodrich wrote the original screenplay.

The film was the second of six feature films based on the characters of Nick and Nora:
 The Thin Man (1934)
 After the Thin Man (1936)
 Another Thin Man (1939)
 Shadow of the Thin Man (1941)
 The Thin Man Goes Home (1945)
 Song of the Thin Man (1947)

Reception
The film was nominated for an Oscar in 1937 for Best Writing, Screenplay. Review aggregator Rotten Tomatoes lists the film with a score of 100% based on reviews from 18 professional critics, with a rating average of 7.65/10.

After the Thin Man grossed a domestic and foreign total of $3,165,000: $1,992,000 from the U.S. and Canada and $1,173,000 elsewhere. It returned a profit of $1,516,000.

Radio adaptation
An hour-long radio adaptation of After the Thin Man was presented on the CBS Lux Radio Theatre on June 17, 1940. Powell and Loy reprised their roles.

References in other media
The film is name-checked by the 1938 American mystery novel The Listening House by Mabel Seeley during an interlude in which the book's protagonist goes to see a film called After the Dark Man.

Home media
After the Thin Man was released on Blu-ray by the Warner Archive Collection on January 26, 2021.

References

External links

 
 
 
 Plot overview at AllMovie
 
 After the Thin Man on Lux Radio Theater: June 17, 1940

1936 films
1930s crime comedy films
1930s mystery thriller films
American black-and-white films
American crime comedy films
American comedy thriller films
American detective films
American mystery thriller films
American sequel films
Films based on American novels
Films based on mystery novels
Films directed by W. S. Van Dyke
Films scored by Herbert Stothart
Films set in San Francisco
Films set in the San Francisco Bay Area
Metro-Goldwyn-Mayer films
Films set around New Year
The Thin Man films
1936 comedy films
Films scored by Edward Ward (composer)
1930s English-language films
1930s American films